Johannes van Bronckhorst (1648–1727) was a Dutch Golden Age painter.

Life
According to Houbraken, he learned to paint from his father Pieter van Bronckhorst, who died when he was thirteen. The young Bronckhorst was sent to work as a pastry baker for a cousin in Haarlem. He drew as a hobby, and it remained a hobby until he moved back to Hoorn to get married.

Work
He specialized in painting plants, birds, and insects. Although he remained a pastry baker, he did very well with his watercolours, which were published in engravings and commemorated with a poem by Johannes Vollenhove.

His pupils were Hendrik Graauw and Herman Henstenburgh. Both Bronckhorst and Herman Henstenburgh worked for the Mennonite art collector and horticulturalist Agnes Block for whom they painted animals, insects and plants from her garden.

References

External links

1648 births
1727 deaths
Dutch Golden Age painters
Dutch male painters
Artists from Leiden